Tiferes Bais Yaakov is a private Jewish school in Toronto, Ontario.

As of 2019, it educates approximately 109 girls from grades 9 to grade 12. Tiferes Bais Yaakov equips each graduate to succeed in pursuing professional excellence, complementing her eventual role as an Akeres Habayis. This is done through a unique and joyful experience, blending rigorous Limudei Kodesh and outstanding secular studies with Torah-true Hashkafa and character-driven student activities. As well, the students receive an outstanding education. 
See .

History 
The school was founded in 2000 with 19 students. By 2013, it had 150 students.

References

External links 
 

High schools in Toronto
Jewish Canadian history
Jewish schools in Canada
Modern Orthodox Jewish day schools
Modern Orthodox Judaism in Canada
Private schools in Toronto
Girls' schools in Canada
2000 establishments in Ontario
Educational institutions established in 2000